Arthur West Sherwin (22 July 1879 — 10 October 1947) was an English cricketer who played first-class cricket for Derbyshire during the 1908 season.

Sherwin was born  in Derby, the son of Samuel Sherwin, a chemist, and his wife Margaret. He made his debut for Derbyshire in the 1908 season in May against Sussex when he scored 7. He played regularly to the end of the season. Sherwin was a right-handed batsman and played 21 innings in 11 first-class matches with an average of 8 and a top score of 24.

Sherwin died in Duffield, Derbyshire at the age of 68. His brother, Charles, two years older, played one match for Derbyshire in the 1907 season.

References

1879 births
1947 deaths
English cricketers
Derbyshire cricketers
Cricketers from Derby